WCCN-FM (107.5 FM) is a radio station  broadcasting a mainstream rock format. Licensed to Neillsville, Wisconsin, United States, the station serves the Neillsville-Marshfield-Tomah-Wisconsin Rapids area. It is owned by Central Wisconsin B/Cg Inc. It features live local DJs and programming from ABC Radio. The station's largest promotion is giving away a Harley Davidson motorcycle every year.

History
The station went on the air as WCCN-FM on 25 July 1979. It changed its call sign to WZZN on 1 April 1991, and to the current WCCN-FM on 2 April 1991.

References

External links

CCN-FM
Mainstream rock radio stations in the United States
Radio stations established in 1979
1979 establishments in Wisconsin